The Most Beautiful Lie is the third album by Sebastian Karlsson.

Track listing
"Stay Forever" 3:57
"Serial Lovers" 3:54
"Up Up High" 3:36
"My Baby Fears No One" 3:41
"Cross My Heart" 3:55
"Come On (Bring Out the Love)" 4:28
"Wake Up Where Your Heart Is" 3:17
"Love Them All" 3:17
"Keep Your Head Up Love" 3:51
"Come As You Are" 4:21
 "My Getaway"  4:29

Tracks 1, 2, 4, 5, 6, 7, 8, 10 & 11 written by Sebastian Karlsson and Peter Kvint.
Track 3 & 9 written by Sebastian Karlsson

Charts

References

2009 albums
Sebastian Karlsson (singer) albums